Paraleprodera mesophthalma is a species of beetle in the family Cerambycidae. It was described by Bi and Lin in 2012. It is known from China.

References

Lamiini
Beetles described in 2012